Cyana is a genus of moths in the family Erebidae. Species are well distributed in Africa, Madagascar, China, India, Sri Lanka, Myanmar, Sumatra, Java and Borneo. The genus was erected by Francis Walker in 1854.

Description
Palpi slender and upturned. Antennae ciliated. Forewing of the male with a more or less strongly developed fringe of hair from the centre of costa on upperside and lobe on underside, which much distorts the sub-costal nervures. Vein 5 absent in male. Vein 6 usually absent in female. Veins 7 to 9 stalked. Hindwing with veins 3 and stalked. Vein 5 above angle of cell and veins 6 and 7 usually stalked.

The pupae of this genus are typically attached to plant surfaces and surrounded by a characteristic trellis of hairs (see figure).

Species
The following are included in BioLib.cz:

 Cyana aarviki Karisch, 2013
 Cyana aberrans Karisch, 2013
 Cyana abyssinica Karisch, 2003
 Cyana adelina (Staudinger, 1887)
 Cyana adita (Moore, 1859)
 Cyana africana (Holland, 1893)
 Cyana alba (Moore, 1878)
 Cyana alborosea (Walker, 1865)
 Cyana alexi (Cerny, 1993)
 Cyana amabilis (Moore, 1877)
 Cyana amatura (Walker, 1863)
 Cyana andromeda (Cerny, 1993)
 Cyana arama (Moore, 1859)
 Cyana arenbergeri Karisch, 2003
 Cyana aroa (Bethune-Baker, 1904)
 Cyana arorai Volynkin et al., 2020
 Cyana asticta (Hampson, 1909)
 Cyana atlanteia N. Singh et al., 2020
 Cyana aurifinis (Cerny, 1993)
 Cyana aurorae Lourens, 2011
 Cyana barbora Volynkin & Saldaitis, 2020
 Cyana basialba (Rothschild, 1913)
 Cyana basisticta (Hampson, 1914)
 Cyana bella Kishida, 1991
 Cyana bellissima (Moore, 1878)
 Cyana bianca (Walker, 1856)
 Cyana bicolor (Rothschild, 1913)
 Cyana bigutta (Karisch, 2005)
 Cyana boetonensis (Jurriaanse & Lindemans, 1920)
 Cyana britomartis N. Singh & Volynkin, 2020
 Cyana brunnea (Bethune-Baker, 1904)
 Cyana capensis (Hampson, 1903)
 Cyana cara Kishida, 1991
 Cyana carmina (Cerny, 1993)
 Cyana catorhoda Hampson, 1897
 Cyana cernyi Lourens, 2011
 Cyana charybdis (Bethune-Baker, 1904)
 Cyana chrysopeleia N. Singh et al., 2020
 Cyana coccinea (Moore, 1878)
 Cyana conclusa (Walker, 1862)
 Cyana consequenta Lourens, 2011
 Cyana cornutissima Volynkin & Lázló, 2020
 Cyana costifimbria (Walker, 1862)
 Cyana crasizona (Wileman & West, 1928)
 Cyana croceizona (Hampson, 1914)
 Cyana curioi Lourens, 2011
 Cyana delicata (Walker, 1854)
 Cyana determinata (Walker, 1862)
 Cyana detoulgoeti Volynkin, 2020
 Cyana detrita Walker, 1854 - type species
 Cyana distincta (Rothschild, 1912)
 Cyana dohertyi (Elwes, 1890)
 Cyana dryope Volynkin & N. Singh, 2020
 Cyana dudgeoni Hampson, 1895
 Cyana effracta (Walker, 1854)
 Cyana ellipsis Karisch & Dall'asta, 2010
 Cyana ethiopica Karisch, 2013
 Cyana euryxantha (Hampson, 1914)
 Cyana exprimata Karisch, 2013
 Cyana fasciata Karisch, 2013
 Cyana flammeostrigata Karisch, 2003
 Cyana formosana (Hampson, 1909)
 Cyana fossi Volynkin & Ivanova, 2021
 Cyana fulvia Linnaeus, 1758
 Cyana gabriellae (Cerny, 1993)
 Cyana gelida Walker, 1854
 Cyana geminipuncta (Cerny, 1993)
 Cyana gonypetes (Prout, 1919)
 Cyana hamata (Walker, 1854)
 Cyana hecqi (Karisch & Dall'asta, 2010)
 Cyana heidrunae (Hoppe, 2004)
 Cyana horsfieldi Roepke, 1946
 Cyana ibabaoae Lourens, 2011
 Cyana ignifera Karisch, 2013
 Cyana inconclusa (Walker, 1862)
 Cyana innocua Karisch, 2013
 Cyana interrogationis (Poujade, 1886)
 Cyana inusitata (Bethune-Baker, 1910)
 Cyana janinae Lourens, 2009
 Cyana katanga Karisch & Dall’Asta, 2010
 Cyana khasiana Hampson, 1897
 Cyana klausruedigerbecki (Karisch, 2005)
 Cyana klohsi Karisch, 2003
 Cyana lada Volynkin, Černý & Saldaitis, 2019
 Cyana leechi Volynkin, 2021
 Cyana libulae (Cerny, 1993)
 Cyana linatula (Swinhoe, 1891)
 Cyana lobata Karisch, 2013
 Cyana loloana (Strand, 1912)
 Cyana luchoana (Karisch, 2003)
 Cyana lunulata Semper, 1899
 Cyana lutipes (Hampson, 1900)
 Cyana luzonica (Wileman & South)
 Cyana magnitrigutta Karisch, 2013
 Cyana malayensis (Hampson, 1914)
 Cyana margarethae (Kiriakoff, 1958)
 Cyana marshalli (Hampson, 1900)
 Cyana metamelas (Hampson, 1914)
 Cyana meyi Karisch, 2013
 Cyana meyricki (Rothschild, 1901)
 Cyana miles Butler, 1887
 Cyana molleri (Elwes, 1890)
 Cyana moupinensis (Leech, 1899)
 Cyana natalensis Karisch, 2013
 Cyana nemasisha (Roesler, 1990)
 Cyana nigroplagata (Bethune-Baker, 1910)
 Cyana nussi Karisch, 2013
 Cyana nyasica (Hampson, 1918)
 Cyana obliquilineata (Hampson, 1900)
 Cyana obscura (Hampson, 1900)
 Cyana occidentalis Volynkin & Lázló, 2020
 Cyana ochrata Karisch, 2013
 Cyana owadai (Kishida, 1991)
 Cyana pallida Karisch, 2013
 Cyana pallidilinea (Karisch, 2003)
 Cyana paramargarethae Karisch & Dall'asta, 2010
 Cyana pauliani (de Toulgoët, 1954)
 Cyana pellucida (Rothschild, 1936)
 Cyana peregrina (Walker, 1854)
 Cyana perornata (Walker, 1854)
 Cyana phycomata (Wileman & West, 1928)
 Cyana pratti (Elwes, 1890)
 Cyana pretoriae (Distant, 1897)
 Cyana pudens (Walker, 1862)
 Cyana puella (Drury, 1773)
 Cyana punctistrigosa (Rothschild, 1913)
 Cyana quadrinotata (Walker, 1869)
 Cyana quentini Karisch, 2003
 Cyana rawlinsi Karisch, 2013
 Cyana rejecta (Walker, 1854)
 Cyana rhodostriata (Hampson, 1914)
 Cyana rosabra (Wileman, 1925)
 Cyana rubrifasciata (Druce, 1883)
 Cyana rubrifinis Lourens, 2011
 Cyana rubristriga (Holland, 1893)
 Cyana rubritermina (Bethune-Baker, 1911)
 Cyana rubriterminalis (Strand, 1912 – incertae sedis)
 Cyana rudloffi Volynkin & N. Singh, 2020
 Cyana rufeola Karisch & Dall’Asta, 2010
 Cyana rufifrons (Rothschild, 1912)
 Cyana ruwenzoriana (Karisch, 2003)
 Cyana rwandana Karisch, 2013
 Cyana saalmuelleri (Butler, 1882)
 Cyana saulia (Swinhoe, 1901)
 Cyana schaeferi (Gaede, 1924 – incertae sedis)
 Cyana selangorica (Hampson, 1903)
 Cyana signa (Walker, 1854)
 Cyana soror (Cerny, 1993)
 Cyana speideli Karisch, 2013
 Cyana squalida Karisch, 2013
 Cyana subalba (Wileman, 1910)
 Cyana sublutipes (Kishida, 1991)
 Cyana subornata (Walker, 1854)
 Cyana suessmuthi Karisch, 2013
 Cyana tettigonioides (Heylaerts, 1892)
 Cyana thoracica (Rothschild & Jordan, 1901)
 Cyana titovi Volynkin, Černý & Ivanova, 2019
 Cyana togoana (Strand, 1912)
 Cyana torrida (Holland, 1893)
 Cyana transfasciata (Rothschild, 1912)
 Cyana treadawayi (Cerny, 1993)
 Cyana trigona (Rothschild, 1903)
 Cyana trigutta Walker, 1854
 Cyana tripuncta (de Toulgoet, 1980)
 Cyana tripunctata Rothschild, 1936
 Cyana ueleana (Karisch, 2003)
 Cyana unipunctata (Elwes, 1890)
 Cyana usambara Karisch, 2013
 Cyana v-nigrum (Cerny, 1993)
 Cyana venusta Karisch, 2013
 Cyana vespertata (Cerny, 1993)
 Cyana watsoni Hampson, 1897
 Cyana yao Volynkin & Lázló, 2020

References

 
  2001: The Moths of Borneo Part 7 Family Arctiidae, subfamily Lithosiinae
 , 1988: Three new species and some synonymic notes on the Arctiidae from Japan, Taiwan and Philippines. Tyô to Ga 39 (2): 99-118. Full article: .
  2003: Beitrag zur kenntnis der gattung Cyana Walker, 1854 in Afrika (Lepidoptera: Arctiidae). Atalanta 34 (1-2): 167–178. Abstract: 
  2005: Eine neue Art aus der Cyana amatura (Walker, 1863) Artengruppe (Lepidoptera: Arctiidae: Lithosiinae). Atalanta 36 (1-2): 169–171.
  2005: Eine neue Cyana-Art aus Ostafrika (Lepidoptera: Arctiidae: Lithosiinae). Atalanta 36 (3/4): 573–574.
 , 2010: New species and subspecies of Cyana Walker, 1854 (Lepidoptera: Arctiidae: Lithosiinae) from the collection of the Royal Museum for Central Africa. Journal of Afrotropical Zoology 6: 117–127.
  2009: A new species of Cyana from Northern Luzon (Philippines) belonging to the lunulata group, with an analysis of differential features and evaluation of elements for group recognition (Lepidoptera: Arctiidae: Lithosiinae). Nachrichten des Entomologischen Vereins Apollo, N.F. 30 (3): 147–160.
  2011: Six new Philippine species of the genus Cyana Walker, 1854 and a review of the geminipuncta-group, with emphasis on endemic development lines on various islands (Lepidoptera: Arctiidae, Lithosiinae). Nachrichten des Entomologischen Vereins Apollo, 32 (1-2): 69–96.

External links
 
 

 
Nudariina
Moth genera